Eric Bergland (April 21, 1844 – November 3, 1918) was a Swedish-born American military officer. The son of religious refugees that brought him from Sweden to the United States, he fought in the American Civil War as a volunteer officer, graduated from West Point at the top of his class, served his adopted country with distinction as an officer of the regular army, a professor of his Alma Mater, and a Western explorer, and married a cousin of the wife of president Rutherford B. Hayes.

Early life
Bergland was the son of Anders Olsson Berglund, a farmer who became a follower of the charismatic revivalist Eric Jansson, whose teachings brought him and his followers into a fierce conflict with the Lutheran Established Church of Sweden. The government persecuted Jansson and his followers, and they decided in 1847 to emigrate to the United States, in search of religious freedom. Anders Berglund and his family, including the three year-old Erik, followed their fellow  believers to Illinois, where they participated in the creation of the Bishop Hill Colony. After the murder of Eric Jansson, his father broke with his old faith, becoming a preacher in the local Methodist Church. At the age of 12 Bergland became an apprentice in the printing office of the Swedish language paper Svenska Republikanaren in Galva. When the paper was moved to Chicago, the Bishop Hill Colony, who owned the printing press, made him manager of the office that remained in Galva.

Civil War
When the American Civil War began, the Bishop Hill Colony raised a volunteer company, and offered it to United States service. The company became Company D, 57th Illinois Volunteer Infantry Regiment, and Bergland, although only 17 years old, was elected Second Lieutenant. He fought at the battles of Fort Donelson, Shiloh, First and Second Corinth, and Resaca, and was promoted to First Lieutenant after Shiloh. In the fall of 1864, Bergland received an appointment to West Point. He took an extension on the appointment, remained on the rolls of the regiment, but served as a military engineer in Ohio till the end of the war.

Military career
Bergland graduated from West Point in 1869, at the top of his class. His place on the graduation list would have given him a commission in the Corps of Engineers, but all the billets were full, and he became a Second Lieutenant in the 5th Artillery. While at this regiment, he participated in the 1870 U.S. Army intervention to prevent Fenian raids into Canada. Two years later he was transferred to the Engineers as a First Lieutenant. Bergland served between 1873 and 1883 several periods at West Point as instructor and professor, only interrupted by three years on Western exploration under George Wheeler, 1875-1878. During these three years he travelled over 2,000 miles on mules and on foot, surveying in California, New Mexico, Arizona, Nevada and Colorado. Promoted to Captain in 1884, he served on a variety of engineering posts in Tennessee, Mississippi, Louisiana, Arkansas, and Texas, as well as company commander, and instructor at the Corp's School of Application. The last years of his military career Bergland spent as a lighthouse engineer. He was promoted to Major in 1895, and retired a year later. In his retirement, the family lived in Baltimore.

Family life
Bergland married Lucy Scott McFarland in 1878. She was a cousin of president Rutherford B. Hayes wife Lucy Webb Hayes. They had four children, John, Eric, William, and Mary Brita. Their oldest son, John, became a well known obstetrician.

References

Notes

Cited literature
 Annual report of the Association of the Graduates of the United States Military Academy at West Point, New York. [cited as Annual Report]
 Bartlett, Richard A. (1962). Great Surveys of the American West. Norman: University of Oklahoma Press.
 Cluett, Willian W. (1886), History of the 57th regiment, Illinois Volunteer Infantry. Princeton, Illinois: T.P. Streeter.
 Johnson, Eric & C. F. Peterson (1880). Svenskarne i Illinois. Chicago: Williamsson. 
 Heitman, Francis B. (1903). Historical Register and Dictionary of the United States Army. Washington: Government Printing Office.
 Kastrup, Allan (1975). The Swedish Heritage in America. Minneapolis: Swedish Council of America.
 Olsson, Nils William & Erik Wikén (1995). Swedish Passenger Arrivals in the United States 1820-1850. Stockholm: Acta Bibliothecæ Regiæ Stockholmensis.
 Princeton Alumni Weekly.

External links

Union Army officers
People of Sweden in the American Civil War
United States Military Academy alumni
United States Army officers
1844 births
1918 deaths
American people of Swedish descent
People from Hälsingland